Rowing at the 2010 Summer Youth Olympics in Singapore took place at the Marina Reservoir between 15–18 August. There were races over a straight course over 1000m.

Competition schedule

Finals
All times are China Standard Time (UTC+8)

Medal summary

Medal table

Events

Boys' Events

Girls' Events

References

 Updated schedule, start lists, and results

 
2010 Summer Youth Olympics events
Youth Summer Olympics
2010
Rowing competitions in Singapore